SV Mehring is a German association football club from the municipality of Mehring, Rhineland-Palatinate. The club's greatest success has been promotion to the tier five Oberliga Rheinland-Pfalz/Saar in 2012 and 2015.

History
SV Mehring was formed on 13 December 1921 and played, for the most part of its history as a local amateur side.

Mehring won promotion to the highest league in the Rhineland, the Rheinlandliga for the first time in 2008. It played at this level for the next four seasons, gradually improving. In 2007–08 the club finished on equal points with Sportfreunde Eisbachtal on first place in the league, won the necessary decider 1–0 and earned promotion to the tier five Oberliga Rheinland-Pfalz/Saar for the first time. It played in the Oberliga for two seasons before being relegated again in 2014. A runners-up finish in the Rheinlandliga in 2014–15 and success in the promotion round took the club back up to the Oberliga for 2015–16. Finishing 17th in the Oberliga in 2015–16 Mehring was relegated back to the Rheinlandliga once more.

Honours
The club's honours:
 Rheinlandliga
 Champions: 2012
 Runners-up: 2011, 2015
 Bezirksliga West
 Champions: 2008
 Runners-up: 2005, 2007
 Kreisliga A Trier-Saarburg
 Champions: 2004

Recent seasons
The recent season-by-season performance of the club:

 With the introduction of the Regionalligas in 1994 and the 3. Liga in 2008 as the new third tier, below the 2. Bundesliga, all leagues below dropped one tier.

References

External links
Official team site 
SV Mehring at Weltfussball.de 

Football clubs in Germany
Football clubs in Rhineland-Palatinate
Association football clubs established in 1921
1921 establishments in Germany